Combo may refer to:

Technology 
Combo television unit, a television with either a VCR or a DVD player built into a single unit
Combo drive, a type of optical drive that can read CDs and DVDs
A guitar amplifier incorporating one or more loudspeakers in the same case as the electronics
Combo organ, a type of portable electronic organ popular in the 1960s
Combo box, a widget in computer graphics
Combo washer dryer, a combination in a single cabinet of a washing machine and a clothes dryer
Opel Combo, a van produced by Opel since 1994

Other uses 
A small musical ensemble
Popular beat combo, a synonym for pop group which has become a British cliché
Combination meal, a group of menu items offered together at a lower price than they would cost individually
Combos, a brand of snack food
COMBO, or COMBO Culture Kidnapper, a French street artist
Combo (video gaming), a combination of moves used in computer games
Striking combination, a combination of strikes
T.J. Combo, a character from the video game Killer Instinct
A character from This is England
Combo Ayouba, the Comoran colonel and senior member who died in 2010
Combo Rangers, a series of Webcomics created in 1998 by Japanese-Brazilian author Fábio Yabu
A character from Jet Set Radio
Combo Panda, a character from Ryan's World

See also
 
 
 Combination (disambiguation)
 Comb (disambiguation)
 Combi (disambiguation)
 Kombo (disambiguation)